Saperstein ( compound Of Hebrew sapir "sapphire" + German Stein "stone".) is a surname.

People
Notable people with the surname include:

Abe Saperstein (1902–1966), founder and coach of the Savoy Big Five, which later became the Harlem Globetrotters
 Abram Saperstein, changed his name to Albert Sabin (1906–1993), Polish-American medical researcher who developed an oral polio vaccine; President of the Weizmann Institute of Science 
Alan Saperstein, Internet Video Pioneer and digital media entrepreneur
David Saperstein (disambiguation)
Esther Saperstein (1901–1988), American politician
Harlan Saperstein, television narrator of several E! True Hollywood Story and History Channel documentaries
Larry Saperstein (born 1998), American actor

Fictional entities
Fictional entities with the surname include:
 Dr. Lu Saperstein, a fictional obstetrician in Parks and Recreation, played by Henry Winkler
 Jean-Ralphio Saperstein, a fictional character in Parks and Recreation, played by Ben Schwartz
 Mona Lisa Saperstein, a fictional character in Parks and Recreation, played by Jenny Slate

Jewish surnames
Yiddish-language surnames
Surnames from ornamental names